Mostuéjouls is a commune in the Aveyron department in southern France.

Population

Notable locals 
 Raymond de Mimèges = de Mostuèjouls, chaplain of Pope John XXII, first bishop of Diocese of Saint-Flour (1317-1319), bishop of Diocese of Saint-Papoul, created Cardinal in 1327

See also 
 Communes of the Aveyron department

References 

Communes of Aveyron
Aveyron communes articles needing translation from French Wikipedia